The Genius of Invention is a British factual television series that was broadcast on BBC Two between 24 January 2013 and 14 February 2013. The series looks over the history of British inventions.

Production
On 23 August 2013, BBC Two controller Janice Hadlow announced the commissioning of the series. The main presenters of the series were Mark Miodownik, Cassie Newland and Michael Mosley.

Episode list

Reception
Terry Ramsey of The Daily Telegraph gave the series three out of five stars and said that "despite the jumpy style and occasionally annoying chat, it had a lot of appealing science packed in, all neatly wrapped up so it didn’t even feel like we were learning. And it served as a useful reminder of just how much we rely on electricity." The Independent'''s Tom Sutcliffe said "everything from presentational style to the level of the material it contains it's essentially a children's programme. In fact, it calls for a new verb: to Bluepeterise, a shorthand for the increasingly fashionable technique of dividing the content up between three puppyishly eager presenters". Lucy Mangan, writing for The Guardian'' called it "terrible".

DVD release
The series was released in the original English as a region 2 DVD set by a Dutch company in 2015.

References

External links

2013 British television series debuts
2013 British television series endings
2010s British documentary television series
BBC television documentaries
BBC high definition shows
2010s British television miniseries
Documentary television series about technology
English-language television shows
Works about the history of photography